This is a list of prime ministers of Croatia since the first multi-party elections in 1990 ranked by the length of their combined terms in office.

Prime ministers

Political parties:

Prime ministers' parties by total time in office (since the 1990 elections)

Croatian Democratic Union — 23 years, 316 days or 8715 days (as of 31 December 2022)
Social Democratic Party of Croatia — 7 years, 360 days or 2917 days

Periods of continuous government by prime ministers' parties since 1990

Croatian Democratic Union — 30 May 1990 – 27 January 2000 (9 years, 242 days or 3529 days)
Social Democratic Party of Croatia — 27 January 2000 – 23 December 2003 (3 years, 330 days or 1426 days)
Croatian Democratic Union — 23 December 2003 – 23 December 2011 (8 years, 0 days or 2922 days)
Social Democratic Party of Croatia — 23 December 2011 – 22 January 2016 (4 years, 30 days or 1491 days)
Non-partisan Prime Minister — 22 January 2016 – 19 October 2016
Croatian Democratic Union — 19 October 2016 – present ( or  days)

Incumbent Prime Minister

Andrej Plenković took office as prime minister on 19 October 2016. On 4 May 2022, he surpassed the tenure of Ivo Sanader (5 years, 195 days) and became the longest-serving prime minister of Croatia since the first multi-party elections in 1990 and independence on 25 June 1991.

If he were to continuously hold the office until:

 25 June 2025, he would break the record held by Vladimir Bakarić (8 years, 248 days) as President of the Government and President of the Executive Council of the People's Republic of Croatia and become the longest-serving head of any Croatian cabinet since World War II
 11 February 2035, he would break the record currently held by Josip Broz Tito (18 years, 115 days) as Prime Minister of Yugoslavia and become the longest-serving head of any government that ruled over Croatia since World War II

See also
List of presidents of Croatia
Speaker of the Croatian Parliament
Prime Minister of Croatia
List of cabinets of Croatia
Speaker of the Chamber of Counties of Croatia

References

Croatia, List of Prime Ministers of

Lists of political office-holders in Croatia
Croatia